Mince and tatties is a popular Scottish dish, consisting of minced beef and mashed potato. The dish is also known in the island of Jamaica, mainly in the Cornish county, as the dish was introduced by the Scottish in the 1800s. It sometimes contains other vegetables or thickening agents. It has had a longtime association with school dinners, while other chefs have attempted to modernise the dish.

Preparation
There is no set recipe or form of cooking and large variations can occur from cook to cook. Essentially the dish consists of varying amounts of minced beef, onions, carrots or other root vegetables, seasoning and stock. Some cooks add thickening agents such as flour, oatmeal or cornflour.

History
Despite concerns that British people are no longer eating traditional dishes, mince and tatties remains popular in Scotland. A survey by the Scottish Daily Express in 2009 found that it was the most popular Scottish dish, with a third of respondents saying that they eat mince and tatties once a week. This placed it above other dishes such as smoked salmon, haggis, Scotch pies and Scotch broth. An annual competition is held in Tobermory on the Isle of Mull to determine the best mince and tatties.

Mince and tatties is well known for being used historically in school canteens, where the quality of the ingredients and the ability to feed a large number of children made it popular. In recent years, there have been attempts by some to modernise the dish, which resulted in it appearing on Time Out magazine's list of the top 100 dishes available in London in 2012. The version from the Dean Street Townhouse restaurant placed on the best of British section of the list.

See also
Collops
Cottage pie
 List of beef dishes
 List of potato dishes

References

Further reading
Maw Broon (2007). Maw Broon's Cookbook. Waverley Books; (18 Oct 2007) , p17

External links
 Mince and Tatties Recipe
 More about Mince and Tatties Recipe

Scottish cuisine
Jamaican cuisine
Beef dishes
Food combinations
Meat and potatoes dishes
Scottish beef dishes